Rowdy L. Herrington (born 1951 in Pittsburgh, Pennsylvania) is a Hollywood director and writer currently residing in Livingston, Montana.  He is married and has no children.

Career
Rowdy attended Penn State from 1969 to 1973 and majored in television production. After college, Rowdy worked at WQED (TV) for two years in a number of production roles. He has, in total, worked fourteen years in television.

Filmography

References

External links
 

1951 births
Living people
American film directors
People from Pittsburgh
People from Livingston, Montana
Donald P. Bellisario College of Communications alumni
Pennsylvania State University alumni